The Prophet Muhammad Museum is a museum about Muhammad in Amman, Jordan. The museum was opened on 15 May 2012 at the King Hussein Mosque in Al Hussein Public Parks in Amman, with King Abdullah II of Jordan officiating.

The museum includes some of Muhammad's belongings, including a single hair from his beard and his letter to the emperor of Byzantium, in which he urged him to convert to Islam. It also includes a sapling of the tree under which Muhammad rested on his way to the Levant for trade in the pre-Islamic era. The tree is located in the badia region.

See also
 List of museums in Jordan

References

Museums established in 2012
Museums in Jordan
Islamic museums
Museums in Amman